The Commonwealth Games, often referred to as the Friendly Games or simply the Comm Games, and colloquially referred to as the Coms or Commies are a quadrennial international multi-sport event among athletes from the Commonwealth of Nations. The event was first held in 1930, and, with the exception of 1942 and 1946 (cancelled due to World War II), have successively run every four years since. The Games were called the British Empire Games from 1930 to 1950, the British Empire and Commonwealth Games from 1954 to 1966, and British Commonwealth Games from 1970 to 1974. Athletes with a disability are included as full members of their national teams since 2002, making the Commonwealth Games the first fully inclusive international multi-sport event. In 2018, the Games became the first global multi-sport event to feature an equal number of men's and women's medal events and four years later they are the first global multi-sport event to have more events for women than men.

Inspired by the Inter-Empire Championships, part of the 1911 Festival of Empire, Melville Marks Robinson founded the British Empire Games which were first held in Hamilton, Canada in 1930. As time progressed, the Games evolved, adding the Commonwealth Paraplegic Games for athletes with a disability (who were barred from competing from 1974 before being fully integrated by 1990) and the Commonwealth Youth Games for athletes aged 14 to 18.

The Games are overseen by the Commonwealth Games Federation (CGF), which controls the sporting programme and selects host cities. The games movement consists of international sports federations (IFs), Commonwealth Games Associations (CGAs) and organising committees for each specific Commonwealth Games. Certain traditions, such as the hoisting of the Commonwealth Games flag and King's Baton Relay, as well as the opening and closing ceremonies, are unique to the Games. Over 4,500 athletes competed at the latest Commonwealth Games in 25 sports and over 250 medal events, including Olympic and Paralympic sports and those popular in Commonwealth countries: bowls and squash. Usually, the first, second and third-place finishers in each event are awarded gold, silver and bronze medals, respectively.
⁹
Although there are 56 members of the Commonwealth of Nations, there are 72 Commonwealth Games Associations. They are divided into 6 regions (Africa, Americas, Caribbean, Europe, Asia and Oceania) and each of them has a similar function to the National Olympic Committees in relation with their countries or territories. In some like India and South Africa, the CGA functions are assumed by their NOCs. One of the differences from other multisport events is that 15 CGAs participating in the Commonwealth Games do not send their delegations independently from the Olympic, Paralympic and other multisports competitions, as 13 are linked to the British Olympic Association, 1 is part of Australian Olympic Committee and another one is part of the New Zealand Olympic Committee as their Paralympic counterparts. They are: the four Home Nations of the United Kingdom (England, Scotland, Wales and Northern Ireland), the British Overseas Territories (Anguilla, Falkland Islands, Gibraltar, Montserrat, Saint Helena and Turks and Caicos Islands), the Crown Dependencies (Guernsey, Isle of Man, and Jersey), Niue and Norfolk Island send separate teams. It is expected that Gabon and Togo will send a team for the first time at the 2026 Commonwealth Games, as the two countries were admitted to the Commonwealth in June 2022 and they did not have time to organise their associations for the 2022 Games which was scheduled for the end of July.

20 cities in nine countries (counting England, Scotland and Wales separately) have hosted the games. Australia has hosted the Commonwealth Games five times (1938, 1962, 1982, 2006 and 2018 and will host the next edition in 2026), more than any other nation. Two cities have hosted Commonwealth Games more than once: Auckland (1950, 1990) and Edinburgh (1970, 1986).

Only six nations have participated in every Commonwealth Games: Australia, Canada, England, New Zealand, Scotland and Wales. Of these six, Australia, England, Canada and New Zealand have each won at least one gold medal in every Games. Australia has been the highest achieving team for thirteen editions of the Games, England for seven, and Canada for one. These three teams also top the all-time Commonwealth Games medal table in that order.

The most recent Commonwealth Games, the 22nd, were held in Birmingham from 28 July to 8 August 2022. The next Commonwealth Games will be the first games in history held in a decentralized way, as they are scheduled to be hosted across four cities in the Australian state of Victoria from 17 to 29 March 2026.

History 

A sporting competition bringing together the members of the British Empire was first proposed by John Astley Cooper in 1891, who wrote letters and articles for several periodicals suggesting a "Pan Brittanic, Pan Anglican Contest every four years as a means of increasing goodwill and understanding of the British Empire." John Astley Cooper Committees were formed in Australia, New Zealand and South Africa to promote the idea and inspired Pierre de Coubertin to start the international Olympic Games movement.

In 1911, an Inter-Empire Championship was held alongside the Festival of Empire, at The Crystal Palace in London to celebrate the coronation of George V, and were championed by The Earl of Plymouth and Lord Desborough. Teams from Australasia (Australia and New Zealand), Canada, South Africa, and the United Kingdom competed in events for athletics, boxing, swimming and wrestling. A correspondent of the Auckland Star criticised the Games, calling them a "grievous disappointment" that were "not worthy of the title of 'Empire Sports'".

Melville Marks Robinson, who went to the 1928 Summer Olympics in Amsterdam to serve as the manager of the Canadian track and field team, strongly lobbied for the proposal of organising the first British Empire Games in Hamilton in 1930.

Editions

British Empire Games 

The 1930 British Empire Games were the first of what later become known as the Commonwealth Games, and were held in Hamilton, in the province of Ontario in Canada from 16 to 23 August 1930 and opened by Lord Willingdon. Eleven countries: Australia, Bermuda, British Guyana, Canada, England, Northern Ireland, Newfoundland, New Zealand, Scotland, South Africa and Wales, sent a total of 400 athletes to compete in athletics, boxing, lawn bowls, rowing, swimming and diving and wrestling. The opening and closing ceremonies as well as athletics took place at Civic Stadium. The cost of the Games were $97,973. Women competed in only the aquatic events. Canadian triple jumper Gordon Smallacombe won the first ever gold medal in the history of the Games.

The 1934 British Empire Games were the second of what is now known as the Commonwealth Games, held in London, England. The host city was London, with the main venue at Wembley Park, although the track cycling events were in Manchester. The 1934 Games had originally been awarded to Johannesburg, but were given to London instead because of serious concerns about prejudice against Asian and black athletes in South Africa. The affiliation of Irish athletes at the 1934 Games representation remains unclear but there was no official Irish Free State team. Sixteen national teams took part, including new participants Hong Kong, India, Jamaica, Southern Rhodesia and Trinidad and Tobago.

The 1938 British Empire Games were the third British Empire Games, which were held in Sydney, New South Wales, Australia. They were timed to coincide with Sydney's sesqui-centenary (150 years since the foundation of British settlement in Australia). Held in the Southern Hemisphere for the first time, the III Games opening ceremony took place at the famed Sydney Cricket Ground in front of 40,000 spectators. Fifteen nations participated down under at the Sydney Games involving a total of 464 athletes and 43 officials. Fiji and Ceylon made their debuts. Seven sports were featured in the Sydney Games – athletics, boxing, cycling, lawn bowls, rowing, swimming and diving and wrestling.

The 1950 British Empire Games were the fourth edition and was held in Auckland, New Zealand after a 12-year gap from the third edition of the games. The fourth games were originally awarded to Montreal, Canada and were to be held in 1942 but were cancelled due to the Second World War. The opening ceremony at Eden Park was attended by 40,000 spectators, while nearly 250,000 people attended the Auckland Games. Twelve countries sent a total of 590 athletes to Auckland. Malaya and Nigeria made their first appearances.

British Empire and Commonwealth Games 

The fifth edition of the Games, the 1954 British Empire and Commonwealth Games, were held in Vancouver, British Columbia, Canada. These were the first Games since the name change from British Empire Games took effect in 1952, the same year of Queen Elizabeth II's reign. The fifth edition of the Games placed Vancouver on a world stage and featured memorable sporting moments as well as outstanding entertainment, technical innovation and cultural events. The 'Miracle Mile', as it became known, saw both the gold medallist, Roger Bannister of England and silver medallist John Landy of Australia, run sub-four-minute races in an event that was televised live across the world for the first time. Northern Rhodesia and Pakistan made their debuts and both performed well, winning eight and six medals respectively.

The 1958 British Empire and Commonwealth Games were held in Cardiff, Wales. The sixth edition of the games marked the largest sporting event ever held in Wales and it was the smallest country ever to host a British Empire and Commonwealth Games. Cardiff had to wait 12 years longer than originally scheduled to become host of the Games, as the 1946 event was cancelled because of the Second World War. The Cardiff Games introduced the Queen's Baton Relay, which has been conducted as a prelude to every British Empire and Commonwealth Games ever since. Thirty-five nations sent a total of 1,122 athletes and 228 officials to the Cardiff Games and 23 countries and dependencies won medals, including for the first time, Singapore, Ghana, Kenya and the Isle of Man. In the run up to the Cardiff games, many leading sports stars including Stanley Matthews, Jimmy Hill and Don Revie were signatories in a letter to The Times on 17 July 1958 deploring the presence of white-only South African sports, opposing 'the policy of apartheid' in international sport and defending 'the principle of racial equality which is embodied in the Declaration of the Olympic Games'.

The 1962 British Empire and Commonwealth Games were held in Perth, Western Australia, Australia. Thirty-five countries sent a total of 863 athletes and 178 officials to Perth. Jersey was among the medal winners for the first time, while British Honduras, Dominica, Papua and New Guinea and St Lucia all made their inaugural Games appearances. Aden also competed by special invitation. Sarawak, North Borneo and Malaya competed for the last time before taking part in 1966 under the Malaysian flag. In addition, Rhodesia and Nyasaland competed in the Games as an entity for the first and only time.

The 1966 British Empire and Commonwealth Games were held in Kingston, Jamaica. This was the first time that the Games had been held outside the so-called White Dominions. Thirty-four nations (including South Arabia) competed in the Kingston Games sending a total of 1,316 athletes and officials.

British Commonwealth Games 

The 1970 British Commonwealth Games were held in Edinburgh, Scotland. This was the first time the name British Commonwealth Games was adopted, the first time metric units rather than imperial units were used in events, the first time the games were held in Scotland and also the first time that HM Queen Elizabeth II attended in her capacity as Head of the Commonwealth.

The 1974 British Commonwealth Games were held in Christchurch, New Zealand. The Games were officially named "the friendly games", and was also the first edition to feature a theme song. Following the massacre of Israeli athletes at the 1972 Munich Olympics, the tenth games at Christchurch were the first multi-sport event to place the safety of participants and spectators as its uppermost requirement. Security guards surrounded the athlete's village and there was an exceptionally high-profile police presence. Only 22 countries succeeded in winning medals from the total haul of 374 medals on offer, but first time winners included Western Samoa, Lesotho and Swaziland (since 2018 named Eswatini). The theme song for the 1974 British Commonwealth Games was called "Join Together".

Commonwealth Games 

The 1978 Commonwealth Games were held in Edmonton, Alberta, Canada. This event was the first to bear the current day name of the Commonwealth Games and also marked a new high as almost 1,500 athletes from 46 countries took part. They were boycotted by Nigeria in protest against New Zealand's sporting contacts with apartheid-era South Africa, as well as by Uganda in protest at alleged Canadian hostility towards the government of Idi Amin.

The 1982 Commonwealth Games were held in Brisbane, Queensland, Australia. Forty-six nations participated in the Brisbane Games with a new record total of 1,583 athletes and 571 officials. As hosts, Australia headed the medal table leading the way ahead of England, Canada, Scotland and New Zealand respectively. Zimbabwe made its first appearance at the Games, having earlier competed as Southern Rhodesia and as part of Rhodesia and Nyasaland. The theme song for the 1982 Commonwealth Games was called "You're Here To Win".

The 1986 Commonwealth Games were held in Edinburgh, Scotland and were the second Games to be held in Edinburgh. Participation at the 1986 Games was affected by a boycott by 32 African, Asian and Caribbean nations in protest at British Prime Minister Margaret Thatcher's refusal to condemn sporting contacts of apartheid era South Africa in 1985, but the Games rebounded and continued to grow thereafter. Twenty-six nations did attend the second Edinburgh Games and sent a total of 1,662 athletes and 461 officials. The theme song for the 1986 Commonwealth Games was called "Spirit Of Youth".

The 1990 Commonwealth Games were held in Auckland, New Zealand. It was the fourteenth Commonwealth Games, the third to be hosted by New Zealand and Auckland's second. A new record of 55 nations participated in the second Auckland Games sending 2,826 athletes and officials. Pakistan returned to the Commonwealth in 1989 after withdrawing in 1972, and competed in the 1990 Games after an absence of twenty years. The theme song for the 1990 Commonwealth Games was called "This Is The Moment".

The 1994 Commonwealth Games were held in Victoria, British Columbia, the fourth to take place in Canada. The games marked South Africa's return to the Commonwealth Games following the apartheid era, and over 30 years since the country last competed in the Games in 1958. Namibia made its Commonwealth Games debut. It was also Hong Kong's last appearance at the games before the transfer of sovereignty from Britain to China. Sixty-three nations sent 2,557 athletes and 914 officials. The theme song for the 1994 Commonwealth Games was called "Let Your Spirit Take Flight".

The 1998 Commonwealth Games were held in Kuala Lumpur, Malaysia. For the first time in its 68-year history, the Commonwealth Games were held in Asia. The sixteenth games were also the first Games to feature team sports – an overwhelming success that added large numbers to both participant and TV audience numbers. A new record of 70 countries sent a total of 5,065 athletes and officials to the Kuala Lumpur Games. The top five countries in the medal standing were Australia, England, Canada, Malaysia and South Africa. Nauru also achieved an impressive haul of three gold medals. Cameroon, Mozambique, Kiribati and Tuvalu debuted. The theme song for the 1998 Commonwealth Games was called "Forever As One".

During the 21st century 

The 2002 Commonwealth Games were held in Manchester, England. The 2002 Games were hosted in England for the first time since 1934 and hosted to coincide with the Golden Jubilee of Elizabeth II, head of the Commonwealth. In terms of sports and events, the 2002 Games were until the 2010 edition the largest Commonwealth Games in history featuring 281 events across 17 sports. The final medal tally was led by Australia, followed by host England and Canada. The 2002 Commonwealth Games had set a new benchmark for hosting the Commonwealth Games and for cities wishing to bid for them with a heavy emphasis on legacy. The theme song for the 2002 Commonwealth Games was called "Where My Heart Will Take Me".

The 2006 Commonwealth Games were held in Melbourne, Australia. The only difference between the 2006 games and the 2002 games was the absence of Zimbabwe, which withdrew from the Commonwealth of Nations. Over 4000 athletes took part in the sporting competitions. Again the Top 3 on the medal table is Australia, followed by England and Canada. The theme song for the 2006 Commonwealth Games was called "Together We Are One".

The 2010 Commonwealth Games were held in Delhi, India. The Games cost $11 billion and are the most expensive Commonwealth Games ever. It was the first time that the Commonwealth Games were held in India, also the first time that a Commonwealth republic hosted the games and the second time they were held in Asia after Kuala Lumpur, Malaysia in 1998. A total of 6,081 athletes from 71 Commonwealth nations and dependencies competed in 21 sports and 272 events. The final medal tally was led by Australia. The host nation India achieved its best performance ever in any sporting event, finishing second overall. Rwanda made its Games debut. The theme song for the 2010 Commonwealth Games was called "Live, Rise, Ascend, Win".

The 2014 Commonwealth Games were held in Glasgow, Scotland. It was the largest multi-sport event ever held in Scotland with around 4,950 athletes from 71 different nations and territories competing in 18 different sports, outranking the 1970 and 1986 Commonwealth Games in Edinburgh, capital city of Scotland. Usain Bolt competed in the 4×100 metres relay of the 2014 Commonwealth Games and set a Commonwealth Games record with his teammates. The Games received acclaim for their organisation, attendance, and the public enthusiasm of the people of Scotland, with Commonwealth Games Federation chief executive Mike Hooper hailing them as "the standout games in the history of the movement".

The 2018 Commonwealth Games were held in Gold Coast, Queensland, Australia, the fifth time Australia hosted the Games. There were an equal number of events for men and women, the first time in history that a major multi-sport event had equality in terms of events.

The 2022 Commonwealth Games were held in Birmingham, England. They are the third Commonwealth Games to be hosted in England following London 1934 and Manchester 2002.

The 2022 Commonwealth Games coincided with the Platinum Jubilee of Elizabeth II and the 10th anniversary of the 2012 Summer Olympics and the 2012 Summer Paralympics, both staged in London.

The 2022 Commonwealth Games were held for the last time under Queen Elizabeth II before her death on 8 September 2022.

On 16 February 2022 it was announced that the 2026 Commonwealth Games will be held for a record sixth time in Australia, but for the first time they will be decentralised, as the state of Victoria signed as host city. The games will have 4 regional clusters mainly focused in Bendigo region and another 3 regional centres. The 2026 Commonwealth Games will be the first games to be held under the reign of King Charles III. It was also confirmed that the Commonwealth Games, scheduled for 2030 were likely to be awarded to Hamilton, Canada.

The three nations to have hosted the Commonwealth Games the most times are Australia (5), Canada (4) and New Zealand (3). With the 2022 games, England increased its number to three and in 2026 Australia will have hosted six times. Six Games have taken place in the countries within the United Kingdom (Scotland (3) and Wales (1)), two in Asia (Malaysia (1) and India (1)) and one in the Caribbean (Jamaica (1)).

Paraplegic Games 

The Commonwealth Paraplegic Games were an international, multi-sport event involving athletes with a disability from the Commonwealth countries. The event was sometimes referred to as the Paraplegic Empire Games and British Commonwealth Paraplegic Games. Athletes were generally those with spinal injuries or polio. The event was first held in 1962 and disestablished in 1974. The Games were held in the country hosting the Commonwealth Games for able-bodied athletes. The countries that had hosted the Commonwealth Paraplegic Games were Australia, Jamaica, Scotland and New Zealand in 1962, 1966, 1970 and 1974. Six countries – Australia, England, New Zealand, Northern Ireland, Scotland and Wales — had been represented at all Commonwealth Paraplegic Games. Australia and England had been the top-ranking nation two times each: 1962, 1974 and 1966, 1970.

Inclusion of EAD events 

Athletes with a disability were then first included the 1994 Commonwealth Games in Victoria, British Columbia when this events was added to athletics and lawn bowls, As at 2002 Commonwealth Games in Manchester, England, they were included as compulsory events, making them the first fully inclusive international multi-sport games. This meant that results were included in the medal count and the athletes are full members of each country delegation.

During the 2007 General Assembly of the Commonwealth Games Federation (CGF) at Colombo, Sri Lanka, the International Paralympic Committee (IPC) and CGF signed a co-operative agreement to ensure a formal institutional relationship between the two bodies and secure the future participation of elite athletes with a disability (EAD) in future Commonwealth Games.

Then, IPC President Philip Craven said during the General Assembly:

The co-operation agreement outlined the strong partnership between the IPC and the CGF. It recognised the IPC as the respective sport body and have the function to oversee the co-ordination and delivery of the Commonwealth Games EAD sports programme and committed both organisations to work together in supporting the growth of the Paralympic and Commonwealth Games Movements.

Winter Games 

The Commonwealth Winter Games was a multi-sport event comprising winter sports, last held in 1966. Three editions of the Games have been staged. The Winter Games were designed as a counterbalance to the Commonwealth Games, which focuses on summer sports, to accompany the Winter Olympics and Summer Olympic Games. The winter Games were founded by T.D. Richardson. The 1958 Commonwealth Winter Games were held in St. Moritz, Switzerland and was the inaugural games for the winter edition. The 1962 Games were also held in St. Moritz, complementing the 1962 British Empire and Commonwealth Games in Perth, Australia, and the 1966 event was held in St. Moritz as well, following which the idea was discontinued.

Youth Games 

The Commonwealth Youth Games is an international multi-sport event organised by the Commonwealth Games Federation. The Games are held every four years with the current Commonwealth Games format. The Commonwealth Games Federation discussed the idea of a Millennium Commonwealth Youth Games in 1997. In 1998 the concept was agreed on for the purpose of providing a Commonwealth multi-sport event for young people born in the calendar year 1986 or later. The first version was held in Edinburgh, Scotland from 10 to 14 August 2000. The age limitation of the athletes is 14 to 18.

Commonwealth Games Federation 

The Commonwealth Games Federation (CGF) is the international organisation responsible for the direction and control of the Commonwealth Games and Commonwealth Youth Games, and is the foremost authority in matters relating to the games. The Commonwealth House in London, England hosts the headquarters of CGF. The Commonwealth House also hosts the headquarters of the Royal Commonwealth Society and the Commonwealth Local Government Forum.

As the International Olympic Committee the Commonwealth Games Movement is made of three major elements:

 International Federations (IFs) are the governing bodies that supervise a sport at an international level. For example, the International Basketball Federation (FIBA) is the international governing body for basketball.
 Commonwealth Games Associations (CGAs) represent and regulate the Commonwealth Games Movement within each country and perform similar functions as the National Olympic Committees. For example, the Commonwealth Games England (CGE) is the CGA of England. There are currently 72 CGAs recognised by the CGF.
 Organising Committees for the Commonwealth Games (OCCWGs) are temporary committees responsible for the organisation of each Commonwealth Games. OCCWGs are dissolved after each Games once the final report is delivered to the CGF.

English is the official language of the Commonwealth. The other language used at each Commonwealth Games is the language of the host country (or languages, if a country has more than one official language apart from English). Every proclamation (such as the announcement of each country during the parade of nations in the opening ceremony) is spoken in these two (or more) languages. If the host country does this, it is their responsibility to choose the language{s) and their order.

King's Baton Relay 

The King's Baton Relay, is a relay around the world held prior to the beginning of the Commonwealth Games. The Baton carries a message from the Head of the Commonwealth, currently King Charles III. The Relay traditionally begins at Buckingham Palace in London as a part of the city's Commonwealth Day festivities. The King entrusts the baton to the first relay runner. At the Opening Ceremony of the Games, the final relay runner hands the baton back to the King or his representative, who reads the message aloud to officially open the Games. The King's Baton Relay is similar to the Olympic Torch Relay.

The Relay was introduced at the 1958 British Empire and Commonwealth Games in Cardiff, Wales as the Queen's Baton Relay. Up until, and including, the 1994 Games, the Relay only went through England and the host nation. The Relay for the 1998 Games in Kuala Lumpur, Malaysia was the first to travel to other nations of the Commonwealth. The Gold Coast 2018 Queen's Baton Relay was the longest in Commonwealth Games history. Covering 230,000 km (150,000 miles) over 388 days, the Baton made its way through the six Commonwealth regions of Africa, the Americas, the Caribbean, Europe, Asia and Oceania. For the first time, the Queen's Baton was presented at the Commonwealth Youth Games during its sixth edition in 2017 which were held in Nassau, Bahamas.

Ceremonies

Opening 

Various elements frame the opening ceremony of the Commonwealth Games. This ceremony takes place before the events have occurred. The ceremony typically starts with the hoisting of the host country's flag and a performance of its national anthem. The flag of the Commonwealth Games Federation, flag of the last hosting nation and the next hosting nation are also hosted during the opening ceremony. The host nation then presents artistic displays of music, singing, dance and theatre representative of its culture. The artistic presentations have grown in scale and complexity as successive hosts attempt to provide a ceremony that outlasts its predecessor's in terms of memorability. The opening ceremony of the Delhi Games reportedly cost $70 million, with much of the cost incurred in the artistic segment.

After the artistic portion of the ceremony, the athletes parade into the stadium grouped by nation. The last hosting nation is traditionally the first nation to enter. Nations then enter the stadium alphabetical or continental wise with the host country's athletes being the last to enter. Speeches are given, formally opening the Games. Finally, the King's Baton is brought into the stadium and passed on until it reaches the final baton carrier, often a successful Commonwealth athlete from the host nation, who hands it over to the Head of the Commonwealth or his representative.

Closing 

The closing ceremony of the Commonwealth Games takes place after all sporting events have concluded. Flag-bearers from each participating country enter the stadium, followed by the athletes who enter together, without any national distinction. The president of the organising committee and the CGF president make their closing speeches and the Games are officially closed. The CGF president also speaks about the conduct of the games. The mayor of the city that organised the Games transfers the CGF flag to the president of the CGF, who then passes it on to the mayor of the city hosting the next Commonwealth Games. The next host nation then also briefly introduces itself with artistic displays of dance and theatre representative of its culture. Many great artists and singers had performed at the ceremonies of the Commonwealth Games.

At the closing ceremony of every Commonwealth Games the CGF President makes an award and presents a trophy to one athlete who has competed with particular distinction and honour both in terms of athletic performance and overall contribution to his or her team. Athletes are nominated by their Commonwealth Games Association at the end of the final day of competition and the winner is selected by a panel comprising the CGF President and representatives from each of the six Commonwealth Regions. The ‘David Dixon Award’ as it is called was introduced in Manchester 2002, after the late David Dixon, former Honorary Secretary of the CGF, in honour of his monumental contribution to Commonwealth sport for many years.

Medal presentation 

A medal ceremony is held after each event is concluded. The winner, second and third-place competitors or teams stand on top of a three-tiered rostrum to be awarded their respective medals. After the medals are given out by a CGF member, the national flags of the three medallists are raised while the national anthem of the gold medallist's country plays. Volunteering citizens of the host country also act as hosts during the medal ceremonies, as they aid the officials who present the medals and act as flag-bearers.

Anthems 
"God Save the King" is an official or national anthem of multiple Commonwealth countries. As a result, and due to the countries of the United Kingdom competing individually, it is not played in some official events, medal ceremonies or before matches in team events.

Anthems used at the Commonwealth Games which differ from a currently-eligible country's national or official anthem(s):

List of Commonwealth Games 

 
Note The 1911 Inter-Empire Championships held in London (as part of a festival to celebrate the coronation of King George V) is seen as a precursor to the modern Commonwealth Games, but is not normally considered an official edition of the Games themselves. Also, the United Kingdom competed as one country, unlike the Commonwealth Games today when they compete as England, Wales, Scotland, and Northern Ireland. Canada topped the medal table by winning 4 events.

Editions

Medal table 
*Note : Nations in italics no longer participate at the Commonwealth Games.
Updated after 2022 Commonwealth Games,

 Totals for Ghana include all medals won as 
 Totals for Zimbabwe include all medals won as 
 Totals for Zambia include all medals won as 
 Totals for Sri Lanka include all medals won as 
 Totals for Guyana include all medals won as

Commonwealth sports 

There are a total of 23 sports (with three multi-disciplinary sports) and a ten seven para-sports which are approved by the Commonwealth Games Federation.  Core sports must be included in each program. Several optional sports may be picked by the host nation, which may consist of some team sports such as basketball. 

In 2015, the Commonwealth Games Federation agreed large changes to the programme which increased the number of core sports, whilst removing a number of optionals, those removed are listed below.

Sports such as the following are sports which have been analyzed by the Commonwealth Games Federation but which are deemed to need expansion in areas such as participation levels within the Commonwealth both at a national (International Federation) and grassroots athletics level, Marketability, Television Rights, Equity, and Hosting Expenses, per Regulation 6 of the Commonwealth Games Constitution; host nations may not pick these sports for their program until the Federation's requirements are fulfilled.

Participation 

Only six teams have attended every Commonwealth Games: Australia, Canada, England, New Zealand, Scotland, and Wales. Australia has been the highest scoring team for thirteen games, England for seven, and Canada for one.

Commonwealth nations yet to send teams 
Very few Commonwealth dependencies and nations have yet to take part:
 Gabon and Togo, the most recent members to join the Commonwealth in 2022 have not as of that date instigated Commonwealth Games federations in their nation. It is expected both nations will make their debut in 2026.
 Tokelau, a dependency of New Zealand was expected to take part the for the first time at the 2010 Games in Delhi but did not do so.
 Ascension Island and Tristan da Cunha, former dependencies of Saint Helena and current parts of the British Overseas Territory of Saint Helena, Ascension and Tristan da Cunha, have never formed their own teams independent from the Saint Helena team.
 Other states, territories, and territorial autonomies with native populations within the Commonwealth that may be eligible include Christmas Island and the Cocos (Keeling) Islands (territories of Australia), Nevis (a federal entity of the Federation of Saint Kitts and Nevis), Rodrigues (Outer Islands of Mauritius), and Zanzibar (a semi-autonomous part of Tanzania).
 Cornwall, represented by the Cornwall Commonwealth Games Association (CCGA), sent a bid for participation in the 2006 Commonwealth Games in 2004. However, their application was rejected by the CGF, who stated that the constitutional status of Cornwall was not an issue that should be resolved through this medium.
 The British Indian Ocean Territory currently has no permanent population although there is a sizeable population who were born in the BIOT but currently live in Mauritius and the United Kingdom and so would be eligible to compete on birth criteria.
 Turkish Republic of Northern Cyprus has made applications to the CGF to send teams.
 It is also conceivable that any future members of the Commonwealth such as applicants (for example South Sudan, Sudan and Yemen) may participate in future games. The Colony of Aden and Federation of South Arabia, precursors to modern Yemen, participated before in 1962 and in 1966. Sudan was an Anglo-Egyptian protectorate until independence in 1956.
 The Pitcairn Islands' tiny population (currently 50 to 60 people) would appear to prevent this British overseas territory from competing.
 The lack of a permanent population would seem to prevent the British overseas territories of South Georgia and the South Sandwich Islands and British Antarctic Territory, the New Zealand territory of Ross Dependency and the Australian external territories of Australian Antarctic Territory, Ashmore and Cartier Islands, Coral Sea Islands and Heard Island and McDonald Islands from competing.

Controversies

Host city contract 

The 1934 British Empire Games, originally awarded in 1930 to Johannesburg, were moved to London after South Africa's pre-apartheid government refused to allow participants of colour.

The 2022 Commonwealth Games were originally awarded to Durban on 2 September 2015, at the CGF General Assembly in Auckland. It was reported in February 2017 that Durban may be unable to host the games due to financial constraints. On 13 March 2017, the CGF stripped Durban of their rights to host and reopened the bidding process for the 2022 games. Many cities from Australia, Canada, England and Malaysia expressed interest to host the games. However, the CGF received only one official bid and that was from Birmingham, England. On 21 December 2017, Birmingham was awarded for the 2022 Games as Durban's replacement host.

Boycotts 

Much like the Olympic Games, the Commonwealth Games have also experienced boycotts:

Nigeria boycotted the 1978 Commonwealth Games at Edmonton in protest of New Zealand's sporting contacts with apartheid-era South Africa. Uganda also stayed away, in protest of alleged Canadian hostility towards the government of Idi Amin.

During the 1986 Commonwealth Games at Edinburgh, a majority of the Commonwealth nations staged a boycott, so that the Games appeared to be a whites-only event. Thirty two of the eligible fifty nine countries—largely African, Asian and Caribbean states—stayed away because of the Thatcher government's policy of keeping Britain's sporting links with apartheid South Africa in preference to participating in the general sporting boycott of that country. Consequently, Edinburgh 1986 witnessed the lowest number of athletes since Auckland 1950. The boycotting nations were Antigua and Barbuda, Barbados, Bahamas, Bangladesh, Bermuda, Belize, Cyprus, Dominica, Gambia, Ghana, Guyana, Grenada, India, Jamaica, Kenya, Malaysia, Nigeria, Pakistan, Papua New Guinea, Solomon Islands, Sri Lanka, St. Vincent and the Grenadines, Sierra Leone, St. Kitts and Nevis, St. Lucia, Mauritius, Trinidad and Tobago, Tanzania, Turks and Caicos Islands, Uganda, Zambia and Zimbabwe. Bermuda was a particularly late withdrawal, as its athletes appeared in the opening ceremony and in the opening day of competition before the Bermuda Olympic Association decided to formally withdraw.

Financial implications 
The estimated cost of the 2010 Commonwealth Games in Delhi were US$11 billion, according to Business Today magazine. The initial total budget estimated by the Indian Olympic Association in 2003 was US$250 million. In 2010, however, the official total budget soon escalated to an estimated US$1.8 billion, a figure which excluded non-sports-related infrastructure development. Until today, the 2010 Commonwealth Games are reportedly the most expensive Commonwealth Games ever.

An analysis conducted by PricewaterhouseCoopers on the 2002, 2006, 2014 and 2018 Commonwealth Games found that each dollar spent by governments on operating costs, games venues and athletes’ villages generated US$2 for the host city or state economies, with an average of more than 18,000 jobs generated by each of the events. Additionally, all four cities enjoyed long-term improvements to transport or other infrastructure through hosting the Games, while some also benefited from the revival of struggling precincts.

Notable competitors 

Lawn bowler Willie Wood from Scotland was the first competitor to have competed in seven Commonwealth Games, from 1974 to 2002, a record equalled in 2014 by Isle of Man cyclist Andrew Roche. They have both been surpassed by David Calvert of Northern Ireland who in 2018 attended his 11th games.

Sitiveni Rabuka was a Prime Minister of Fiji. Beforehand he represented Fiji in shot put, hammer throw, discus and the decathlon at the 1974 British Commonwealth Games held in Christchurch, New Zealand.

Greg Yelavich, a sports shooter from New Zealand, has won 12 medals in seven games from 1986 to 2010.

Lawn bowler Robert Weale has represented Wales in 8 Commonwealth Games, 1986–2014, winning 2 gold, 3 silver and 1 bronze.

Nauruan weightlifter Marcus Stephen won twelve medals at the Games between 1990 and 2002, of which seven gold, and was elected President of Nauru in 2007.

Australian swimmer Ian Thorpe has won 10 Commonwealth Games gold medals and 1 silver medal. At the 1998 Commonwealth Games in Kuala Lumpur, he won 4 gold medals. At the 2002 Commonwealth Games in Manchester, he won 6 gold medals and 1 silver medal.

Chad le Clos, South Africa's most decorated swimmer, has won 18 medals from four Commonwealth Games (2010, 2014, 2018 & 2022), seven of which are gold. At the 2014 Commonwealth Games in Glasgow, he won two gold medals, one silver medal, and four bronze medals. At the 2018 Commonwealth Games in Gold Coast, he won three golds, a silver and a bronze.

English actor Jason Statham took part as a diver in the 1990 Commonwealth Games.

At the 2022 Commonwealth Games in Birmingham, Australian singer Cody Simpson won a gold medal as a swimmer at the men's 4 × 100 metre freestyle relay.

See also

Notes

References

Sources 

 Brown, Geoff and Hogsbjerg, Christian. Apartheid is not a Game: Remembering the Stop the Seventy Tour campaign. London: Redwords, 2020. .

Further reading 

 Phillips, Bob. Honour of Empire, Glory of Sport: the history of athletics at the Commonwealth Games. Manchester: Parrswood Press, 2000. .

External links 

 
 Commonwealth Games Federation (CGF) at the Commonwealth website 
 "Commonwealth Games". Encyclopædia Britannica Online.
 
 insidethegames – the latest and most up to date news and interviews from the world of Olympic, Commonwealth and Paralympic Games
 ATR – Around the Rings – the Business Surrounding the Multi-sport events
 GamesBids.com – An Authoritative Review of Games Bid Business (home of the BidIndex™)

 

Events in the British Empire
Multi-sport events
Politics and sports
Quadrennial sporting events
Recurring sporting events established in 1930